Strychnine poisoning can be fatal to humans and other animals and can occur by inhalation, swallowing or absorption through eyes or mouth. It produces some of the most dramatic and painful symptoms of any known toxic reaction, making it quite noticeable and a common choice for assassinations and poison attacks. For this reason, strychnine poisoning is often portrayed in literature and film, such as the murder mysteries written by Agatha Christie.

The probable lethal oral dose in humans is 1.5 to 2 mg/kg. Similarly, the median lethal dose for dogs, cats, and rats ranges from 0.5 to 2.35 mg/kg.

Presentation in humans
Ten to twenty minutes after exposure, the body's muscles begin to spasm, starting with the head and neck in the form of trismus and risus sardonicus. The spasms then spread to every muscle in the body, with nearly continuous convulsions, and get worse at the slightest stimulus. The convulsions progress, increasing in intensity and frequency until the backbone arches continually. Convulsions lead to lactic acidosis, hyperthermia and rhabdomyolysis. These are followed by postictal depression. Death comes from asphyxiation caused by paralysis of the neural pathways that control breathing, or by exhaustion from the convulsions. The subject usually dies within 2–3 hours after exposure.

One medical student in 1896 described the experience in a letter to the Lancet:

Three years ago I was reading for an examination,
and feeling "run down". I took 10 minims of strychnia
solution (B.P.) with the same quantity of dilute phosphoric acid
well diluted twice a day. On the second day of taking
it, towards the evening, I felt a tightness in the "facial
muscles " and a peculiar metallic taste in the mouth. There was
great uneasiness and restlessness, and I felt a desire to walk
about and do something rather than sit still and read.
I lay on the bed and the calf muscles began to stiffen and 
jerk. My toes drew up under my feet, and as I moved or
turned my head flashes of light kept darting across my eyes.
I then knew something serious was developing, so I crawled
off the bed and scrambled to a case in my room and got out
(fortunately) the bromide of potassium and the chloral. I
had no confidence or courage to weigh them, so I guessed
the quantity-about 30 gr. 30 grains, about 2 grams bromide of potassium and 10 gr.
chloral-put them in a tumbler with some water, and drank
it off. My whole body was in a cold sweat, with anginous
attacks in the precordial region, and a feeling of "going
off." I did not call for medical aid, as I thought that the symptoms were
declining. I felt better, but my lower limbs were as cold as ice, and the calf muscles kept tense and were
jerking. There was no opisthotonos, only a slight stiffness 
at the back of the neck. Half an hour later, as I could
judge, I took the same quantity of bromide, potassium
and chloral– and a little time after I lost consciousness and
fell into a " profound sleep," awaking in the morning with 
no unpleasant symptoms, no headache, &c., but a desire " to
be on the move " and a slight feeling of stiffness in the jaw.
These worked off during the day.

Treatment
There is no specific antidote for strychnine. "The convulsions are often triggered by stimuli – when your body senses something, neurons want to fire, and if they aren’t controlled seizures occur – so patients are generally kept in quiet, dark rooms." Treatment of strychnine poisoning involves an oral application of an activated charcoal infusion which serves to absorb any poison within the digestive tract that has not yet been absorbed into the blood. Anticonvulsants such as phenobarbital or diazepam are administered to control convulsions, along with muscle relaxants such as dantrolene to combat muscle rigidity. If the patient survives past 24 hours, recovery is probable.

The treatment for strychnine poisoning in the late 19th and early 20th centuries was to administer tannic acid which precipitates the strychnine as an insoluble tannate salt, and then to anaesthetise the patient with chloroform until the effects of the strychnine had worn off.

Detection in biological specimens
Strychnine is easily quantitated in body fluids and tissues using instrumental methods in order to confirm a diagnosis of poisoning in hospitalized victims or to assist in the forensic investigation of a case of fatal overdosage. The concentrations in blood or urine of those with symptoms are often in the 1–30 mg/L range.

Strychnine toxicity in animals
Strychnine poisoning in animals occurs usually from ingestion of baits designed for use against rodents (especially gophers and moles) and coyotes. Rodent baits are commonly available over-the-counter, but coyote baits are illegal in the United States. However, since 1990 in the United States most baits containing strychnine have been replaced with zinc phosphide baits. The most common domestic animal to be affected is the dog, either through accidental ingestion or intentional poisoning.
The onset of symptoms is 10 to 120 minutes after ingestion. Symptoms include seizures, a "sawhorse" stance, and opisthotonus (rigid extension of all four limbs). Death is usually secondary to respiratory paralysis. Treatment is by detoxification using activated charcoal, pentobarbital for the symptoms, and artificial respiration for apnea.

In most western nations a special license is needed to use and possess strychnine for agricultural use.

Notable instances
The most notable incidents which probably involved strychnine poisoning, are listed here. 
Alexander the Great may have been poisoned by strychnine in contaminated wine in 323 BC.
Christiana Edmunds, the "Chocolate Cream Poisoner", laced chocolates with strychnine. She poisoned a number of people and murdered a four-year-old boy in Brighton in the 1870s.
Margot Begemann, a friend of Vincent van Gogh, attempted suicide by ingesting strychnine in 1884.
In the late 19th century, serial killer Thomas Neill Cream used strychnine to murder several prostitutes on the streets of London.
Walter Horsford was hanged in 1898 for murdering his cousin with strychnine, to whom he'd sent it on the pretence it was an otherwise harmless abortifacient. He was implicated in two other murders which also involved mailing it to women who suspected they were pregnant by him.
Belle Gunness of La Porte, Indiana, also known as "Lady Bluebeard", allegedly used strychnine to murder some of her victims at the turn of the 20th century.
Jane Stanford, co-founder of Stanford University and wife of California governor Leland Stanford, died from strychnine poisoning in 1905. Her last recorded words were "My jaws are stiff. This is a horrible death to die." Her murderer was never identified.
French inventor Jean-Pierre Vaquier poisoned Alfred Jones, the husband of his lover Mabel Jones, by putting strychnine in his hangover cure in Byfleet, Surrey, in 1924. Vaquier was hanged for the crime.
Hubert Chevis, a lieutenant in the British Army, died in suspicious circumstances after eating partridge laced with strychnine at Blackdown Camp, Surrey, in 1931. The poisoner was never identified.
Yoshio Nishimura, a prominent Japanese expatriate and president of the Japanese Association, died of strychnine poisoning shortly after arriving at police headquarters in Singapore for questioning by Special Branch in 1934. The coroner rendered an open verdict. The incident was speculated to be connected to espionage.
In 1938, Delta Blues legend Robert Johnson died after drinking a bottle of whiskey which was allegedly laced with strychnine. This account of Johnson's death is disputed, as he died several days after the alleged poisoning.
Oskar Dirlewanger, the notorious leader of the SS Sturmbrigade Dirlewanger in the Second World War, was known to have murdered several Jewish women by stripping them naked and having them injected with strychnine. He and his officers then watched them convulse until death, just for their entertainment.
Irene Bates, mother of possible Zodiac Killer victim Cheri Jo Bates, died of strychnine poisoning in early July, 1969.  She had been living in the city of Riverside, California.
Carolyn Nadine Davis died of strychnine poisoning in mid-July, 1973.  She is included among the Santa Rosa Hitchhiker Murder victims.
 In October 1987, successful wax museum owner Patsy Wright died from taking cold medicine laced with strychnine. The story was featured on a segment of Unsolved Mysteries, and it is suggested that someone very close to Wright knew her habit of taking nighttime cold medicine when she had trouble sleeping and laced her cold medicine with strychnine. The case remains unsolved.
A woman in San Diego, California, was poisoned with strychnine by her husband in 1990. Though she dialed 911, she did not mention her name or address, and rescue workers had difficulty locating the victim. Persistence on the part of the dispatcher and the rescue workers allowed them to locate and extract the victim, but she eventually died in the hospital.
Turgut Özal, 8th president of the Republic of Turkey, was said to have been assassinated in 1993 by strychnine poisoning. A special investigation into the former president's death was commissioned. His body was exhumed for testing in 2012, but the results were inconclusive.
In 2008, Hannes Hirtzberger, the Mayor of Spitz in Lower Austria, was reported to have been poisoned by local wine producer Helmut Osberger using strychnine. Hirtzberger barely survived and suffered permanent disability.
The body of David Lytton was found on Saddleworth Moor, northwest England, in December 2015 after he consumed a lethal dose of strychnine. His identity remained a mystery until January 2017.
Early 20th-century Portuguese poet and novelist Mário de Sá-Carneiro committed suicide via strychnine poisoning in 1916 aged 25.

In folklore
Mount Chocura in the White Mountains of New Hampshire is named for a Native American Chief who reputedly died near the summit after being hunted by a posse in response to a killing spree he went on. One account says that the cause of his attacks was the death of his young son from an accidental dose of strychnine while in the care of a friendly white settler. 
Some Pentecostal snake handlers in the United States claim to have drunk strychnine in order to demonstrate their faith, following a Biblical passage: "They shall take up serpents; and if they drink any deadly thing, it shall not hurt them..."

In music
In "Cyanide Sweet Tooth Suicide", Shinedown mentions a woman addicted to substances taking strychnine.
In his song "I'm Gonna Kill You", Hank Green sings about wanting to put someone on a strychnine diet.
In "The End of All Things To Come", Mudvayne sings about killing the entire world with strychnine.
The Sonics' song "Strychnine" (later covered by The Cramps and The Fuzztones), is about the consumption of strychnine.
In the song "You Love Us" by Manic Street Preachers, strychnine is mentioned.
Strychnine is mentioned in Hannah Fury's song "The Necklace of Marie Antoinette".
Tom Lehrer's song "Poisoning Pigeons in The Park" mentions feeding strychnine to a pigeon.
In "Composing" from Boys Night Out's concept album Trainwreck, The Patient poisons his entire family at the dinner table with strychnine.
In "Visions", Twisted Insane mentions strychnine twice.
In "The Bomb Song", Darwin Deez sings about people being sick from strychnine in the water.
Strychnos nux-vomica, a natural source of strychnine, is mentioned in "Hill of the Poison Tree", by death metal band Miseration.
Strychnine.213, the sixth studio album by Belgian death metal band Aborted, takes its title from strychnine.
"I Killed Robert Johnson" by The Stone Foxes mentions killing a man with strychnine.
Immortal Technique in the song "That's What It Is".
Yeasayer mentions, "deadly quaker buttons" in the song "I Am Chemistry", these are the seeds of the strychnine tree (*Strychnos nux-vomica L.).
Graham Parker song Harridan of Yore contains the lyrics A tiny vial of strychnine hung around her neck"
Brazilian artist Elis Regina in the song "Tiro Ao Álvaro" sings to the subject that "teu olhar mata mais do...que veneno estriquinina", literally "your gaze kills more than strychinine poison".
In "Coyote, My Little Brother," American folksinger Peter La Farge sings how the environment has been "strychnined" to kill off coyote populations.
In The Mountain Goats song "An Antidote for Strychnine" the narrator sings about trying to find an antidote to being poisoned by strychnine.

Fictional instances
Strychnine has also served as an inspiration in several books, movies and TV series.

In literature
In William S. Burroughs novel Naked Lunch, strychnine is described as a "hot shot", a poisonous shot of heroin sold to informants.
In Anne of Green Gables Miss Cuthbert is warned against adopting an orphan girl with a story about a girl who poisoned her entire adopted family by putting strychnine in the well.
In Agatha Christie's novel The Mysterious Affair at Styles, Mrs. Emily Inglethorp was killed by strychnine poisoning.
In Agatha Christie's short story The Coming of Mr Quin, Mr Appleton died of strychnine poisoning.
In Agatha Christie's story How Does Your Garden Grow?, Miss Amelia Barrowby was killed by strychnine poisoning.
The Joker makes a cameo appearance in the DC Comics Elseworld graphic novel Gotham by Gaslight as a serial killer who tries to kill himself with strychnine; the poison causes muscle contractions that leave him with a permanent grin. Additionally, a derivative of strychnine is cited as a key ingredient in the Joker's deadly toxic gas in the main continuity.
In the James Herriott novels All Creatures Great and Small (1972) and All Things Wise and Wonderful (1977), the main character/local veterinarian deals with several victims of strychnine poisoning when a dog-killer attacks the neighborhood dogs.
 In "The Fox Hunter" chapter of William Le Queux's Secrets of the Foreign Office, a strychnine derivative is suspected in the murder of Beatrice Graham and the attempted murder of the protagonist Duckworth Drew. The poison was applied to pins concealed in Graham's fur shawl and Drew's hotel towel.
In Gabriel García Márquez's novel One Hundred Years of Solitude, Colonel Aureliano Buendía survived strychnine poisoning.
Herb in Die Softly by Christopher Pike.
In Peter Robinson's novel Cold Is the Grave, Chief Constable Riddle’s daughter, Emily, is accidentally killed by cocaine laced with a lethal dose of strychnine.
In Hans Scherfig's novel Stolen Spring, a high school student kills his teacher with a strychnine-tainted malt drop.
In the manga Spiral: Suiri no Kizuna (by Kyou Shirodaira and illustrated by Eita Mizuno), main character Ayumu Narumi takes strychnine after he is threatened by Rio Takeuchi to test his luck in a game.
In The Sign of the Four by Sir Arthur Conan Doyle, where Bartholomew Sholto is killed by a poison dart. Dr. Watson confirms it was strychnine poisoning, causing tetanus, thus the devilish grin on the dead Sholto's face.
In The Invisible Man by H. G. Wells, the Invisible Man relates that he took strychnine as a sleeping aid. "Strychnine," he says, "is a grand tonic...to take the flabbiness out of a man."
In The Count of Monte Cristo by Alexandre Dumas, the Saint-Mérans and the servant Barrois are consecutively poisoned to death having ingested beverages containing strychnine. The death of Barrois is depicted with symptoms of acute convulsions, asphyxia, severe pain, ringing in the ears and visual glares that are precipitated by touch.
In The Anubis Gates the protagonist combats strychnine poisoning by eating ash and cinder of a fireplace, remembering that carbon neutralizes strychnine from stomach.
In "Ghoul" (1987), a serial killer police procedural by Michael Slade, a woman is essentially tortured to death by strychnine poisoning. She is tied spread-eagle on a waterbed by ropes as she suffers escalating muscle spasms. The undulations of the fluid mattress encourages more and more agonizing spasms until death ensues. Police detectives examining the crime scene later note how rope loops tied to the bedposts were flattened by the force put upon them by the victim's contortions.
In Stephen King's novel Mr. Mercedes, Brady Hartsfield plans to poison a dog using hamburger laced with strychnine-based gopher poison. His mother finds and eats the hamburger herself, and Brady comes home to find her suffering agonizing convulsions. When she dies, her mouth is twisted into a grin.
In Jack London's short story "The Story of Jees Uck", Neil Bonner is poisoned by eating biscuits laced with strychnine by Amos Pentley. Neil survives and sends Amos into the frozen wilderness to his death.
In Jack London's short story "Just Meat", partners-in-crime Matt and Jim successfully steal $500,000 of diamonds and pearls from an unscrupulous jewel merchant. Overcome by greed, both characters want to eliminate the other and unknowingly poison each other with strychnine. 
In Jack London's short story "Moon-Face", the unnamed protagonist/narrator develops a deep and obsessive hate for his neighbor who is always cheerful even under the most dire situations. He poisons the neighbor's dog with strychnine and beefsteak in an effort to make him even the least bit unhappy. The neighbor, despite the death of his dog, continues to be unreasonably merry and joyful, forcing the protagonist to create a devious plan.

Onscreen, in film
A Blueprint for Murder (1953) is about how a stepmother is stopped after beginning to kill her family members for insurance money. 
Norman Bates' mother and her lover were killed with strychnine in Alfred Hitchcock's Psycho (1960). The sheriff comments: "Ugly way to die."  The source book by Robert Bloch provides additional details about the strychnine murders.
In J. Lee Thompsons's movie Cape Fear (1962), Max Cady poisons Sam Bowden's dog with strychnine.
 At the end of the movie Office Space (1999), Milton mentions to a waiter: "And yes, I won't be leaving a tip, 'cause I could... I could shut this whole resort down. Sir? I'll take my traveler's checks to a competing resort. I could write a letter to your board of tourism and I could have this place condemned. I could put... I could put... strychnine in the guacamole. There was salt on the glass, BIG grains of salt."
 In Wes Anderson's The Grand Budapest Hotel (2014), Madame Desgoffe-und-Taxis is found dead by strychnine poisoning. Later, a bottle labeled "strychnine poison" is seen on the desk of an assassin in her son Dmitri's employ.
 In Rituparno Ghosh's 2003 Bengali film Shubho Mahurat (an adaptation of Agatha Christie's The Mirror Crack'd from Side to Side), veteran actress Padmini Chowdhury (played by Sharmila Tagore) commits a series of murders by variously administering strychnine on the victims. Upon being exposed by Ranga Pishima (played by Rakhee Gulzar) Padmini also commits suicide using strychnine
In the Bollywood film, Detective Byomkesh Bakshy! (2015), council member Gajanand Sikdaar is killed by adding strychnine to his breakfast just before he can reveal the murderer's name to the protagonist, Bakshy. A bottle of strychnine is found in his nephew, Sukumar's room. It is later revealed that his mistress, Angoori Devi had poisoned him and framed Sukumar on orders of her beloved Yang Guang.
In the film The Wild Geese (1978) Roger Moore's character Shawn Flynn poisoned the son of a crime lord by making him eat the drugs he had him transport having laced them with Strychnine.
In the film Red Dog (2011) The red kelpie was believed to be poisoned deliberately in 1979 by strychnine.
In the film Jaws (1975) Mr. Hooper planned to kill the shark with an injection of strychnine nitrate administered through a shark dart.

Onscreen, in television
The murder in the Monk episode "Mr. Monk and the Secret Santa" is carried out by poisoning a bottle of port with strychnine.
 In New York Undercover season 4, episode 10 – "Sign o' the Times" – a serial killer kills young men at raves by giving them strychnine-laced Ecstasy.
Inmates in the popular TV series The Wire were given cocaine and heroin doses laced with strychnine.
In season 9 of The Office Dwight tells Angela that his Aunt had poisoned her nurse with Strychnine.
In season 4 of "The Glades" episode "Glade-iators!" the victim is poisoned with moisturizer laced with strychnine-based rat poison.
In season 3 of “Father Brown” episode “The Time Machine” The murderer has used strychnine to kill two people and make it look like suicide. 
In season 6 of "ER" episode "Humpty Dumpty" a patient comes in with Strychnine poisoning, as diagnosed by Dr. Gabriel Lawrence.
In season 4 of "Game of Thrones" episode "The Lion and the Rose" King Joffrey dies from poison. The symptoms resemble those of Strychnine poisoning.
In the tenth episode of The Haunting of Hill House, Luke Crain nearly dies after injecting himself with strychnine rat poison while under the spell of a malevolent ghost.
In season 8B of the popular Australian prison series Wentworth, inmate Sheila Bausch (Marta Dusseldorp) is given one final choice by fellow inmate Lou Kelly (Kate Box) – ingest a vial of strychnine, or have her throat slit. Bausch opts for the former. Bausch is subsequently euthanised by Marie Winter (Susie Porter) to end the pain and suffering caused by the poisoning.

References

External links 

 CDC Emergency Preparedness and Response: Facts About Strychnine
 The Merck Veterinary Manual: Strychnine Poisoning: Introduction

 
Poisons